BASIC Magazine is a fashion magazine based in Beverly Hills, CA. It is a quarterly publication, founded by a fashion photographer and BASIC CEO & Editor-in-Chief Viktorija Pashuta in 2016. BASIC Magazine is published by BASIC Media Company LLC and distributed Internationally. BASIC Magazine is a registered trademark.

According to BASIC Magazine it "is a first class visual and editorial publication that features carefully curated content with a strong independent voice." BASIC Magazine is published quarterly with pages being inspired by artists, visuals masterpieces and themes that set the tone of the issue. Different sections are included in the a magazine, ranging from latest trends to fashion and art work to projects and inspirational role models.

History
BASIC Magazine first print edition was released in February 2016. 

Its viral project Women Superheroes was highlighted on Ads of the World website.

Issues
BASIC 1: BASIC Instinct - Cover I Kat Graham and Cover II Josh Mario John
BASIC 2: BASIC Power - Cover I Jess Glynne and Cover II Geisha by Thom Kerr
BASIC 3: BASIC Generation - Cover I Benny Harlem and Cover II Olive 
BASIC 4: BASIC Magic- Cover I Dita Von Teese and Cover II Fashion Illustration by Alyona Lavdovskaya
BASIC 5: BASIC Vibez - Cover I Pia Mia and Cover II Dollz 
BASIC 6: BASIC Rebel - Cover I Shiva Safai and Cover II Women Superheroes
BASIC 7: BASIC Present. Past. Future. - Cover I David Guetta and Cover II Art Cover
BASIC 8: BASIC Voyage - Cover I Michelle Rodriguez and Cover II Sofia Boutella
BASIC 9: BASIC Saga - Cover I  Tyga  and Cover II Art Cover Picasso
BASIC 10:BASIC Spectacle - Cover I Steve Aoki  Cover II Isla Fisher Cover III Zara Larsson Cover IV Cirque Du Soleil

See also
Fashion in the United States

References

External links

2016 establishments in California
Fashion magazines published in the United States
Magazines established in 2016
Magazines published in Los Angeles
Quarterly magazines published in the United States
Women's magazines published in the United States
Women's fashion magazines
Mass media in Los Angeles County, California